Nukeh (also Romanized as Nūkeh; also known as Nārekān and Nārkan) is a village in Howmeh Rural District, in the Central District of Semnan County, Semnan Province, Iran. At the 2006 census, its population was 4, in 4 families.

References 

Populated places in Semnan County